Baronetcies have been granted to the Perrott family. One was created on 28 June 1611 in the Baronetage of England, but the first holder died before his Letters Patent were sealed, so it has been deemed not to be created. The first complete creation was on 1 July 1716 in the Baronetage of Great Britain and the second on 21 June 1911, in the Baronetage of the United Kingdom.

The written record of the family starts with Stephen Perrot of Poptown in Pembroke, who died in 1338.

A descendant, Sir John Perrot, KB, Lord of Haroldston and of Langhorn, which castle he built, was also Lord of Carew and its castle, in Pembrokeshire, to which he added substantially. He was Lord Deputy of the Province, Lieutenant-General and sometime Governor of Ireland under Elizabeth I, Admiral of England, Privy Councillor, and possessed estates said to be worth an annual revenue of £22,000 per annum. He married twice. By his first wife he had a son, Sir Thomas Perrott, 1st Baronet of Haroldston, created 28 June 1611, who died before his Letters Patent was even issued, having married in 1583 Lady Dorothy, sister of Robert Devereux, 2nd Earl of Essex.

Sir Thomas had two daughters: Elizabeth, who married John Pryse of Gogerthan; and Penelope, who first married famed astronomer Sir William Lower in 1601, and second, Sir Robert Naunton, one of the biographers of Sir John, and Secretary of State to James I of England. (The existence of a third daughter Dorothy, said to have married a cousin, James Perrott, Lord of Wellington, is purely fictitious.) Sir John's son by his mistress, Sybill Jones, was Sir James Perrot, Knt., Privy Councillor. This family suffered greatly for being cavaliers during the civil war, their estates ravaged.

Perrott baronets of Plumstead, Kent (1716)

Sir James Perrott, 1st Baronet, also listed as Sir Robert Perrott (died 1731)
Sir Richard Perrott, 2nd Baronet (–1796)
Sir Edward Bindloss Perrott, 3rd Baronet (1 September 1784 – 24 March 1859)
Sir Edward George Lambert Perrott, 4th Baronet (10 May 1811 – 4 June 1886)
Sir Herbert Charles Perrott, 5th Baronet (26 October 1849 – 15 February 1922) (extinct on his death)

Perrott baronets of Plumstead, Kent (1911)
Sir Herbert Charles Perrott, 1st Baronet (26 October 1849 – 15 February 1922) CH 1918 (extinct on his death)

See also
List of extinct baronetcies

Notes

References

Extinct baronetcies in the Baronetage of Great Britain
Extinct baronetcies in the Baronetage of the United Kingdom
1611 establishments in England
1716 establishments in Great Britain
1911 establishments in the United Kingdom
Perrot family